Seoul International Drama Awards, simply known as SDA, is an annual award ceremony based in Seoul, South Korea which honors excellence in television drama productions worldwide.

Winners

Grand prize (Daesang)

Program
Winners are given the "Golden Bird Prize," and runners-up the "Silver Bird Prize."

Individual

Outstanding Korean drama

People's choice

Special awards

See also 

 List of Asian television awards
 Shanghai Television Festival
 International Drama Festival in Tokyo

References

External links

Awards established in 2006
South Korean television awards
Annual events in South Korea
2006 establishments in South Korea